Year 1459 (MCDLIX) was a common year starting on Monday (link will display the full calendar) of the Julian calendar.

Events 
 January–December 
 January 18 – The Order of Our Lady of Bethlehem is founded by Pope Pius II, to defend the island of Lemnos.
 September 23 – Wars of the Roses: Battle of Blore Heath in England – Yorkists under Richard Neville, 5th Earl of Salisbury, defeat a Lancastrian force.
 October 12 – Wars of the Roses: With a royal force advancing on his fortress at Ludlow, Richard Plantagenet, Duke of York, flees to Ireland, while his ally Richard Neville, 16th Earl of Warwick (Warwick the Kingmaker, eldest son of the Earl of Salisbury) goes to Calais.

 Date unknown 
 The Wallachian town of Bucharest is first mentioned.
 The city of Jodhpur, in western India, is founded by Rao Jodha of Marwar.
 Richard, Duke of York, Lord Lieutenant of Ireland, returns on a second visit to Ireland.  The Irish Parliament, meeting at Drogheda, upholds his authority against Henry VI, and an English Act of Attainder. 
 Richard Hygons, English composer, begins fifty years of service at Wells Cathedral.

 Religion 
 King Stephen Thomas of Bosnia forces the clergy of the Bosnian Church into exile.
 According to a legend, the wedding of Christian Rosenkreuz takes place.

Births 
 January 25 – Paul Hofhaimer, Austrian organist and composer (d. 1537)
 March 2 – Pope Adrian VI (d. 1523)
 March 6 – Jakob Fugger, German banker (d. 1525)
 March 22 – Maximilian I, Holy Roman Emperor (d. 1519)
 May 15 – John I, Count Palatine of Simmern (1480–1509) (d. 1509)
 July – Mingyi Nyo, founder of the Toungoo Dynasty of Burma (Myanmar) (d. 1530)
 July 11 – Kaspar, Count Palatine of Zweibrücken, German nobleman (d. 1527)
 October 6 – Martin Behaim, German explorer and cartographer (d. 1507)
 December 22 – Sultan Cem, pretender to the Ottoman throne (d. 1495)
 December 27 – King John I Albert of Poland (d. 1501)
 date unknown – Edward Poynings, Lord Deputy to King Henry VII of England (d. 1521)
 Christina Brask, Swedish writer and translator (d. 1520)
 probable – Lorenzo di Credi, Florentine painter and sculptor (d. 1537)
 date unknown – Jheronimus de Clibano, Dutch composer (d. 1503)
 date unknown – Jean Mouton, French composer (d. 1522)

Deaths 
 February 14 – Stephen, Count Palatine of Simmern-Zweibrücken (b. 1385)
 March 3 – Ausiàs March, Catalan poet from Valencia (b. 1397)
 May 2 – Antoninus of Florence, Italian archbishop (b. 1389)
 August 27 – James of Portugal, Portuguese cardinal (b. 1433)
 September 6 – Katharina of Nassau-Beilstein, German regent 
 September 17 – Isabella of Urgell, Duchess of Coimbra, Portuguese Duchess (b. 1409)
 September 23 (killed at the Battle of Blore Heath):
 James Tuchet, 5th Baron Audley (b. 1400)
 Thomas Dutton, English knight (b. 1421)
 September 24 – Eric of Pomerania, King of Norway, Denmark and Sweden (b. 1382)
 October 30 – Gian Francesco Poggio Bracciolini, Italian humanist (b. 1380)
 November 5 – John Fastolf, English soldier
 December 4 – Adolf VIII, Duke of Southern Jutland (b. 1401)

References